John W. Taylor (December 13, 1873 – March 4, 1938) was a right-handed pitcher in Major League Baseball for the Chicago Cubs and St. Louis Cardinals.

Career
He made his major league debut with the Cubs on September 25, 1898. His best years as a pitcher were 1900 (2.55 earned run average), 1902 (1.33 ERA with 7 shutouts; #1 in the league), 1903 (2.45 ERA), and 1906 (1.99 ERA). He recorded a career 2.65 ERA.

In 1904, Taylor set a major league record by pitching 39 consecutive complete games.  Taylor actually threw 187 consecutive complete games between June 1901 and August 1906, but this streak was interrupted by 15 additional relief appearances.  Thus Taylor appeared in 202 consecutive games without being relieved himself.

Taylor and fellow Cub Larry McLean were traded to the St. Louis Cardinals in return for Mordecai Brown and Jack O'Neill in December 1903; he was then traded back to Chicago in July 1906 (in return for Fred Beebe and Pete Noonan).

Thus he was part of the great 1906 Cubs; that year the ERA for the entire pitching staff was 1.76. He also contributed to the World Series-winning season in 1907.

Taylor was an above-average hitting pitcher in his major-league career, posting a .222 batting average (236-for-1063) with 110 runs, 2 home runs and 88 RBI. He also drew 66 bases on balls.

Taylor died in Columbus, Ohio at the age of 64.

See also
 List of St. Louis Cardinals team records
 Complete game records
 List of Major League Baseball annual ERA leaders
 List of Major League Baseball individual streaks
 List of Major League Baseball career hit batsmen leaders
 Jack Taylor (1890s pitcher)

References

Sources

External links

1873 births
1938 deaths
Major League Baseball pitchers
Chicago Orphans players
Chicago Cubs players
St. Louis Cardinals players
Baseball players from Ohio
National League ERA champions
People from Perry County, Ohio
Milwaukee Brewers (minor league) players
Milwaukee Creams players
Columbus Senators players
Grand Rapids Wolverines players
Kansas City Blues (baseball) players
Dayton Veterans players
Evansville Strikers players
South Bend Bux players
South Bend Benders players
Grand Rapids Grads players
Grand Rapids Black Sox players
Grand Rapids Bill-eds players
19th-century baseball players